Harp Hill is a detached hill,  high, that is triangular in plan, the northwest and southeast sides of which are defined by ridgelike rock exposures, located at the north side of the MacDonald Hills in the Asgard Range of Victoria Land, Antarctica. It was named descriptively by the Advisory Committee on Antarctic Names in 1997 from its distinctive appearance.

References

Asgard Range
Hills of Victoria Land
McMurdo Dry Valleys